The Boston Weekly Magazine (1802–1808) of Boston, Massachusetts, was established by Gilbert & Dean in 1802, "devoted to morality, literature, biography, history, the fine arts, agriculture, &c. &c.". Joshua Belcher, Samuel T. Armstrong, Oliver C. Greenleaf, and Susanna Rowson were also affiliated with its production. The magazine ceased in 1808.  The magazine was later published under the same name by David H. Ela and John B. Hall in 1840–41.

References

Further reading

 Boston Weekly Magazine. Boston: Gilbert & Dean. v.1 (1802–1803); v.2 (1803–1804); v.3 (1804–1805).
 Rollo G. Silver. Belcher & Armstrong Set up Shop: 1805. Studies in Bibliography, Vol. 4, (1951/1952), pp. 201–204

19th century in Boston
1800s in the United States
Cultural history of Boston
Defunct literary magazines published in the United States
Magazines established in 1802
Magazines disestablished in 1808
Magazines published in Boston
Weekly magazines published in the United States